Mycena crocata is a species of agaric fungus in the family Mycenaceae. The common name saffrondrop bonnet refers to the red or orange latex that it exudes if the stipe is broken. Its habitat is woody debris and leaf litter in deciduous woodland, especially beech.

References

External links

Fungi described in 1794
Fungi of Europe
crocata
Taxa named by Heinrich Schrader (botanist)